Frederick Shaeffer was an American football coach.  He served as the co-head football coach at Fordham University with Bob Carmody for one season in 1897. Together they compiled a record of 2–1–1.

Head coaching record

References

Year of birth missing
Year of death missing
Fordham Rams football coaches